The New Zealand national rugby union team have competed since 1884, and there are a number of individual records achieved since that time. The team is also known as the All Blacks, and have competed in Test rugby since their match against Australia in 1903. The world record for Test appearances is held by Richie McCaw—who played 148 Test matches for the team between 2001 and 2015. McCaw was also the first All Black to play over 100 Test matches; a record he achieved during the 2011 Rugby World Cup. The record for most Test points by an All Black is held by Dan Carter, who scored 1598 points between 2003 and 2015. The record for the number of Test tries is held by Doug Howlett, who scored 49 tries in 62 matches between 2000 and 2007.

Most caps

Current as of England vs New Zealand, 19 November 2022. Statistics include officially capped matches only. Current All Blacks are indicated in bold type

Most tries

Current as of England vs New Zealand, 19 November 2022. Statistics include officially capped matches only. Current All Blacks are indicated in bold type

Most points

Current as of England vs New Zealand, 19 November 2022. Statistics include officially capped matches only. Current All Blacks are indicated in bold type

Most points in a match

Current as of England vs New Zealand, 19 November 2022. Statistics include officially capped matches only. Current All Blacks are indicated in bold type

Most tries in a match

Current as of England vs New Zealand, 19 November 2022. Statistics include officially capped matches only. Current All Blacks are indicated in bold type

Most matches as captain

Current as of England vs New Zealand, 19 November 2022. Statistics include officially capped matches only. Current All Blacks are indicated in bold type

Youngest players

Current as of England vs New Zealand, 19 November 2022. Statistics include officially capped matches only. Current All Blacks are indicated in bold type.

Oldest players

Current as of England vs New Zealand, 19 November 2022. Statistics include officially capped matches only. Current All Blacks are indicated in bold type

References 

player records
Rugby union records and statistics